In the Green Star's Glow is a science fantasy  novel by American writer  Lin Carter, the final book in his Green Star Series. It was published in 1976.

Plot summary 

Janchan and Arjala are married in Komar, where they also honeymoon. Karn, feeling that he needs to do something (almost anything) to help rescue Niamh, takes some of the leftover food/drink items from the wedding feast and stashes them in the storage compartment of the sky-sled which he then energises and heads towards the trees. As it is night, he quickly tethers it to a branch and falls asleep. He is awakened the next morning by a spear-point touching his chest—held by a teenaged girl, Varda. Some of Varda's companions (including one named Iona, at 15 slightly older than Varda) urge her to kill him. Due to Iona being a rival for leadership, Varda decides to spare but enslave Karn.

On the tubular craft, Niamh scratches Delgan and advances on him with her knife but Delgan manages to persuade her to sheathe it through some oily words. Then, he forces her to back against the rear bulkhead by pointing the zoukar at her with a threat to use it, and advances to throw her off—only to be prevented as Zorak shoots him in the hand with an arrow. Due to the pain, he cannot use an oily tone, and his further attempts to persuade Niamh that he is "friendly" fall flat. When Zorak comes forward to stop the aircraft, Delgan tells him to back off or die—and is not persuaded of danger when Zorak points out the approaching tree boles. A branch then strikes inside the cockpit and pulls Delgan out—so he was the falling occupant seen by Zarqa and Janchan. After stopping the aircraft, Zorak and Niamh find themselves facing a ythid. Zorak tries to kill it by shooting it in the eye (unsuccessfully, as the lizard shuts its nictitating-membrane), while Niamh tries to poke her knife in from its back—which allows Zorak to shoot it in the throat. Niamh then almost faints from exhaustion and fear; Zorak, putting aside his weapons, prevents this but slips off the branch after stepping in the dead ythids blood. Niamh, taking the weapons, explores the branch until she comes upon a tower of strange design/construction (Karn would have told her that it was built by one of Zarqa's race), where she walks into a lab with a detached head. The head's eyes open and it cries "waa-waa-waaa...", whereupon an odd-looking dwarf, Quoron, comes in and takes her as prisoner. The head is the result of one of his experiments which failed (he believes, due to the brain being disconnected from oxygen for too long). He puts her under the guard of another of his experiments, Number Nine, a giant with four arms and two heads (one male, one female) but almost no intellect (according to Quoron). Niamh quickly figures that Quoron's experiments are just like those Zarqa told her the Kaloodha had conducted—a quest for immortality.

Zorak, meanwhile, lands on a flower which tries to swallow him. As he struggles, a voice tells him to relax and wait for night. He finds the source of the voice to be a kraan, Xikchaka. The logic of Xikchaka is that when the petals close, the two of them can then destroy them (Xikchaka with his mandibles and claws, Zorak by pulling them at base)--which Zorak accepts, allowing the two to escape at night. As Zorak attempts to part later from Xikchaka, the latter's horde captures and enslaves him, setting him to manufacture weapons (swords, spears, bows, …) specifically modified for kraan usage. He finds out from Xargo, the chief smith (captive), that this is due to the plans of the horde's ruler, Rkkith, to invade and destroy one of the treetop cities, Phaolon—a plan put into Rkkith's mind by a treacherous, odd human captive. The treacherous captive once accompanies Rkkith on a weapons-manufacturing inspection tour—and is recognised by Zorak as Delgan (to no surprise). Eventually, when the horde nears Phaolon, they find an odd structure and a group of kraan led by Xikchaka (with Zorak along as a slave) is sent to investigate.

Quoron eventually boasts to Niamh that he has perfected the technique by which his brain will survive—and trained Number Nine to do the surgery, as it can be performed much faster due to the multiple arms. He then chains Niamh and forces her to watch the surgery, grinning when his head is finally disconnected from his torso—only to react in horror as Number Nine then stabs him in the brain (and to death). Number Nine then destroys the lab, putting WaWa (the head which had made that sound, so-named by Quoron) out of misery. The kraan party has meantime, entered the tower, except for Xikchaka and the two guarding Zorak. They are promptly slain by Number Nine, but not before they maul the giant severely with their jaws and claws. Outside, Zarqa has arrived; when one of the kraan guards tries to stab him (with modified spear), Zarqa grabs the weapon and flings it through the insect's body—allowing Zorak to break the neck of the other. Zarqa then tells him that they must hurry as he has sensed Niamh's mind-radiations from a Kalood-built tower nearby. When they enter the tower, they find the lab destroyed—and no Niamh (though they do see the broken chains that held her, and know she is still alive). Zorak recovers his bow and quiver and the two then leave to search further.

Xikchaka has freed Niamh from the chains with his mandibles and claws—and tells her to tell Zorak that at least one kraan (Xikchaka) now understands the meaning of "friendship", and also warns her that the kraan are advancing on Phaolon. Niamh then finds the tubular craft and pilots it away.

Meanwhile, the amazons discover Karn's journey-stash and hit it with wild abandon—getting drunk in the process. Varda then forces Karn to lie in her bed—and is warned by him that another is watching. Iona, the watcher, then goes to get the other girls to gang-up on (and kill) Karn and Varda. Karn takes Varda in the sky-sled and pilots it away. Varda then asks Karn to kiss her; the two are then startled by a scream, as Niamh has seen them, leaving Karn dejected.

Eventually, the kraan arrive in the neighbourhood of Phaolon and are detected by scouts. Phaolon's warriors, on their zaiphs attack the kraan host, but are not able to blunt the attack much—due to the sheer numbers of kraan pushing forward. Delgan smiles on seeing this, as his plan has been to destroy Phaolon—hoping the grief of its loss will then kill Karn, Niamh and others. Just then, two aircraft with three aboard come into view and land in Phaolon. Delgan recognises the pilots as Karn and Niamh, but does not know the third occupant (Varda). Karn and Niamh quickly take some of Phaolon's archers and fly out over the kraan host to do much more damage (than the frontal attack). At that point, Zarqa and Zorak (who Delgan also recognises) come in—the Kalood determines the kraan officers and directs Zorak to slay them. The loss of officers throws the forwardmost kraan into a state of retreat, and the ones following to continue pressing forward on "last orders", creating a jam which the Phaolonese exploit. This panics Rkkith, who flees. Delgan shouts that he can turn the tide of battle, but Rkkith in his panic fails to recognise him—mauling the Blue Barbarian Warlord (with his claws) and throwing him aside. Delgan then slays Rkkith with the zoukar, and has a last laugh before expiring.

Xikchaka now becomes the new ruler of the kraan and negotiates a withdrawal from Phaolon. He promises his friend Zorak (who has served as emissary) that the kraan will never again attack the treetop cities. Varda then explains what happened to Niamh, who promptly announces to the victorious Phaolonese that she and Karn are to be married.

Sometime after the marriage, the author puts Prince Karn's body in a state of temporary suspended animation and makes a temporary return to his earthly body—to write down the accounts, and instructions for their release. Before he returns permanently (leaving the crippled, earthly body to die naturally) to Phaolon, he writes "I am caught in the Green Star's spell, and never' wish to be free of it!".

References

External links

1976 American novels
1976 fantasy novels
1976 science fiction novels
American fantasy novels
Novels by Lin Carter
Books with cover art by Michael Whelan
DAW Books books
Dwarves in popular culture